Pickaway Rural Historic District is a national historic district located at Pickaway, near Union, West Virginia, Monroe County, West Virginia.  The district includes 126 contributing buildings, 1 contributing sites, and 7 contributing structures centered on Pickaway and surrounding rural areas. Notable properties in the core include the Reverend John Simpson House (1840), Pickaway School (1890), Trinity Methodist Episcopal South Church (1887), Pickaway Store and Post Office (c. 1885), and frame mill and blacksmith shop (c. 1800).  Surrounding farms included in the district are the Gilchrist-Pritt-Perrine farms; Overholt-Gilcrist-Pritt and McClung farms; Beckett, Kilcollin, and Lemon farms; and Siebold and Weikle farms.

It was listed on the National Register of Historic Places in 1999.

References

National Register of Historic Places in Monroe County, West Virginia
Historic districts on the National Register of Historic Places in West Virginia
Greek Revival architecture in West Virginia
Queen Anne architecture in West Virginia
Buildings and structures in Monroe County, West Virginia
Historic districts in Monroe County, West Virginia
Blacksmith shops